Thermophis is a genus of snakes in the family Colubridae. The genus is endemic to China.

Species 
The genus includes three species:

 Thermophis baileyi (Wall, 1907) - Bailey's snake, hot-spring keelback, Xizang hot-spring keelback
 Thermophis shangrila  Peng, Lu, Huang, Guo and Zhang, 2014 - Yunnan hot-spring keelback, Shangrila hot-spring keelback
 Thermophis zhaoermii Guo, Liu, Feng & He, 2008 - Sichuan hot-spring keelback

References

Further reading
 , 1953: The taxonomic status of the Tibetan colubrid snake Natrix baileyi. Copeia 1953 (2):92-96.
 , 2007: The ecological specialist, Thermophis baileyi (Wall, 1907): new records, distribution and biogeographic conclusions. Herpetological Bulletin, 101: 8–12.
 , 2010: Isolation and characterization of microsatellite markers in the Tibetan hot spring snake (Thermophis baileyi). Molecular Ecology Resources, 10: 1098–1105.
 , 2012: Population genetic structure and geographic differentiation in the hot spring snake  Thermophis baileyi (Serpentes, Colubridae): indications for glacial refuges in southern-central Tibet. Molecular Phylogenetics and Evolution, 63: 396–406.
 , 2012: Evidence of Sex-biased Dispersal in Thermophis baileyi Inferred from Microsatellite Markers. Herpetologica, 68(4): 514–522. .
 ; ; ; ; ; ; 2014: Effects of Pleistocene climatic fluctuations on the phylogeography, demography and population structure of a high-elevation snake species, Thermophis baileyi, on the Tibetan Plateau. Journal of Biogeography, 41: 2162–2172.

Colubrids
Snake genera